"Dracula"/"The Rose" is a 7" single (Megadisc MD 5270) by Dutch rock and roll band Claw Boys Claw. "Dracula" had earlier been released on the Hitkillers album, a collection of covers of Dutch hits from the 1960s and 1970s. The B-side, "The Rose," was recorded in 1988 but never released. On 25 March 1989, "Dracula" reached #85 on the Dutch charts, where it spent a total of 4 weeks.

The two songs were also issued as a CD single (Megadisc MDC 5270) with a number of bonus tracks. These nine songs, most of which covers, were recorded on October 6, 1986 (on sleeve incorrectly listed as June 10, 1986), when the Claw Boys Claw, operating under the name "The Hipcats," opened for Nick Cave & The Bad Seeds in Vredenburg, Utrecht.

Track listing

Credits

John Cameron - guitar
Pete TeBos - vocals
Bobbio Rossini - bass
Marius Schrader - drums
Allard Jolles - producer (tracks 1 and 2)
Frank van der Weij - engineer (track 1)
Michiel Jansen - engineer (track 2)
Herman Geerling - engineer (tracks 3-11)

Recording
Track 1 recorded at Orkater Studios, Amsterdam, 1988; mixed at Zeezicht Studios
Track 2 recorded and mixed at SPN Studios, Amsterdam, 1988
Tracks 3 through 11 recorded at Vredenburg, Utrecht, October 6, 1986 (on sleeve incorrectly listed as June 10, 1986)

References

See also
Claw Boys Claw discography

Claw Boys Claw albums